Scallywag may refer to:

 Scallywag (magazine), an alternative community magazine of the 1990s
 Scallywags (Second World War), a nickname for the British Auxiliary Units, who were to engage in guerilla warfare in the event of a Nazi invasion
 Scallywagga, a 2007 British comedy sketch show

See also
 Scalawag (disambiguation)
 Scally, a surname of Irish origin